John Thomas (Jan 27, 1792 – March 5, 1866) was an American politician.

Thomas, son of John Thomas, Esq., was born in Woodbridge, Conn., Jan 27,1792.  He graduated from Yale College in 1811.  He studied law in New Haven, Conn., and practiced here for several years. In 1824 he removed to Cortlandville, N. Y., where he obtained prominence in his profession, the practice of which he continued until a few years before his death. He served in the New York State Legislature, and became earnestly identified with the abolition party, and a frequent contributor to its publications. In 1860 he removed to the residence of his only surviving child, a son, at Galesburg, Illinois.

He married, Dec. 3, 1815, Caroline, daughter of Elias Beers, of New Haven. She survived him until March 20, 1867.  He died in Galesburg, aged 74.

External links

1792 births
1866 deaths
People from Galesburg, Illinois
People from Woodbridge, Connecticut
People from Cortland County, New York
Yale University alumni
Members of the New York State Legislature
Connecticut lawyers
New York (state) lawyers
19th-century American politicians
19th-century American lawyers